Juan Domingo de la Cruz Fermanelli (born 6 February 1954) is an Argentinean-born Spanish basketball player. He competed in the men's tournament at the 1980 Summer Olympics and the 1984 Summer Olympics.

Born in Buenos Aires, de la Cruz arrived to FC Barcelona in 1975 and eventually received the Spanish nationality and was capped by the Spanish national team.

References

External links
 

1954 births
Living people
Argentine men's basketball players
Basketball players at the 1980 Summer Olympics
Basketball players at the 1984 Summer Olympics
Basketball players from Buenos Aires
Bàsquet Manresa players
CB Valladolid players
FC Barcelona Bàsquet players
Liga ACB players
Medalists at the 1984 Summer Olympics
Olympic basketball players of Spain
Olympic medalists in basketball
Olympic silver medalists for Spain
Saski Baskonia players
Spanish men's basketball players
1982 FIBA World Championship players
1986 FIBA World Championship players